John Stearns (1770 – 1848) was an American physician.

His father was a physician and he was educated at Yale College, followed by an internship in a doctor’s office on the countryside. He studied medicine at the College of Physicians of Philadelphia and in 1793 he settled as a physician in Waterford (New York).

Together with two friends, he founded a Society for combating empiricism and quackery, which in 1806 totalled 20 regional Societies who were united in 1807 in a Federal Society. Stearns was secretary (1807–1814) and later (1819–1821) president of that Federal Society. From 1810 to 1813 he was sent to the State legislature in Albany. In 1813 he settled as a physician in New York City.

Selected publications 
 Account of the Pulvis parturiens, a Remedy for Quickening Child-Birth. In: New York Medical Repository, Hexade II, Band V (1808), S. 308–309 (Digitalisat) 
 An essay on the bilious epidemic fever, prevailing in the state of New-York : to which are added, a letter from Dr. James Mann, hospital-surgeon ; and a dissertation by Dr. John Stearns, delivered before the state medical society, on the same subject ; with notes and observations on these productions. H. C. Southwick, Albany 1813 (Digitalisat)
 An address delivered before the Medical Society of the State of New-York, and the members of the legislature: at the capitol in the city of Albany, the 2d. of February 1820, on the influence of the mind upon the body in the production and cure of diseases. E. & E. Hosford, Albany 1820 (Digitalisat)
 Philosophy of mind, developing new sources of ideas, designating their distinctive classes, and simplifying the faculties and operations of the whole mind. W. Osborne, New York 1840 (Digitalisat)
 An address, delivered on the occasion of assuming the chair as president, at the first regular meeting of the New York Academy of Medicine, February 3d, 1847. H. Ludwig, New York 1847 (Digitalisat)

References 

1770 births
1848 deaths
19th-century American physicians